Rayburn is both a surname and a masculine given name. Notable people with the name include:

People

Surname
Bentley Rayburn (born 1953), American air force general and businessman; son of Robert G. Rayburn; brother of Robert S. Rayburn
Gene Rayburn (1917–1999), American television and radio personality
Gregory F. Rayburn (born 1958), American businessman
Jim Rayburn (1909–1970), American Presbyterian minister
Joel Rayburn (born 1969), American diplomat, author, and soldier
Margaret Rayburn (1927–2013), American educator and politician
Margie Rayburn (1924–2000), American singer
Ray Rayburn (1948–2021), American audio and electrical engineer, author, and standards analyst
Robert G. Rayburn (1915–1990),  American pastor and college president; father of Bentley and Robert S. Rayburn
Robert S. Rayburn (born 1950), American pastor and theologian; son of Robert G. Rayburn; brother of Bentley Rayburn
Sam Rayburn (1882–1961), American politician
Sam Rayburn (American football) (born 1980), American football player
Sixty Rayburn (1916–2008), American politician
Virgil Rayburn (1910–1991), American football player
Wendell G. Rayburn (born 1929), American educator and college president

Given name
Rayburn Doucett (born 1943), Canadian politician
Rayburn Wright (1922–1990), American musician

Fictional characters
The Rayburn family on the Netflix series Bloodline

Masculine given names